Jonah Hodges is an American football running back.  He has played for the University of San Diego since 2014 and previously played for the California Golden Bears football team.  During the 2014 season, he rushed for over 1,200 yards, totaled over 1,700 all-purpose yards, and set a San Diego Toreros football record with 275 rushing yards in a game. He was selected as a first-team All-Pioneer Football League player in 2014.

University of California, Berkeley career 
Hodges started his collegiate career playing for the University of California from 2012 to 2013. He was redshirted as a freshman, but during the next season he played in two home games, one against Oregon State and one against USC. In the game against USC he rushed four times, totaling 31 yards. After the 2013 season, he was granted permission to contact other Universities in regards to transferring for the coming season.

University of San Diego career 
As a second-year player, he was a running back and he had 12 starts. In those 12 starts, Hodges carried the ball for 1,214 yards. With those 1,214 yards, he carried the ball 221 times and recorded six touchdowns. During the 2014 season, he was named  All-PFL (Pioneer Football League) first team, USD's Offensive MVP, and USD's Strength Coach Award. He also made the 2014 PFL Honor Roll. Jonah Hodges also set the University of San Diego's record for single game rushing yards at 273 yards. In the 2015 season, he was named to the 2015 All-PFL Preseason First Team.

References

Sources 

 http://m.espn.go.com/ncf/playercard?playerId=535266&src=desktop
 https://www.usatoday.com/story/sports/ncaaf/2014/10/11/hodges-carries-san-diego-past-stetson-31-23/17129955/

External links 
 

1993 births
Living people
California Golden Bears football players
San Diego Toreros football players